Mollugo is a genus in the flowering plant family Molluginaceae. It comprises a few dozen species of herbaceous plants, including Mollugo verticillata, carpetweed or green carpetweed.

Selected species
Mollugo cerviana
Mollugo gracillima
Mollugo nudicaulis
Mollugo pentaphylla
Mollugo verticillata

External links
 Mollugo in the Flora of North America
 Mollugo in the Flora of China
 Mollugo in the Flora of Pakistan

Molluginaceae